Ashton is a village in the Eye, Moreton and Ashton civil parish of Herefordshire, England, and is  north from Leominster,  north from the city and county town of Hereford, and in the catchment area of the River Lugg. The village is on the A49 road; to the north is Brimfield. Bordering the village to the south-west is Berrington Hall.

Recorded in the Domesday Book, Ashton was in the hundred of Leominster. In the National Gazetteer of Britain and Ireland of 1868 it was listed as in the hundred of Wolphy.

References

External links 
 
 Ashton, Herefordshire - Vision of Britain
 Ashton, Herefordshire - Explore Britain
 Geograph images for OS Grid SO5164

Villages in Herefordshire